Papuapterote is a genus of moths in the family Eupterotidae.

Species
 Papuapterote crenulata (Joicey & Talbot, 1916)
 Papuapterote punctata (Joicey & Talbot, 1916)
 Papuapterote styx (Bethune-Baker, 1908)

References

Eupterotinae
Moth genera